Maria de Lourdes "Malu" da Silveira Mäder (born 12 September 1966) is a Brazilian actress.

Biography
Born in Rio de Janeiro, she is the daughter of Rubens Tramujas Mäder, a Brazilian army colonel (who gives his name to the RJ-163 highway, which goes to Penedo) and Ângela Maria da Silveira, a social worker. She is of Lebanese, Luxembourgish and Portuguese descent. At age 10 she was taken by her cousin Maísa, who was starting to date her older brother, to watch the play Capitães da Areia, and then she decided to perform.

In 1972, she enrolled in the course for actors at the Tablado Theater, directed by Maria Clara Machado, and had as teacher Carlos Wilson, director of Capitães da Areia and also actress Louise Cardoso as a teacher.

Personal life
She has been married since 1990 to musician, presenter and writer Tony Bellotto, who is part of the Brazilian rock band Titãs. Actress Betty Gofman was the mediator of the couple's formation. Two children were born from the union, João Mäder Bellotto, born May 14, 1995, and Antonio Mäder Bellotto, born September 1, 1997.

Filmography 
2018: Malhação: Vidas Brasileiras - Melissa Kavaco (special appearance)
2018: Tempo de Amar - Ester Delamare, the Baroness of Sobral (special appearance)
2016: Haja Coração - Rebeca Rocha de La Fuente
2013: Sangue Bom - Rosemere Moreira
2010: Ti Ti Ti - Suzana Martins 
2008: Sexo Com Amor? - Paula (film)
2007: Eterna Magia - Eva Sullivan
2004: Sexo Amor & Traição - Ana
2004: A Grande Família - Himself (special appearance)
2003: Celebridade - Maria Clara Diniz
2002: O Invasor - Cláudia/Fernanda
2001: Sítio do Picapau Amarelo - Cuca disguised as Malu Mader
2001: Bellini and the Sphinx - Fátima
2000: Brava Gente (episode: "Dia de Visita") - Delourdes
1999: Força de um Desejo - Ester Delamare, the Baroness of Sobral
1998: Labirinto - Paula Lee
1997: A Justiceira - Diana
1996: A Vida Como Ela É...
1993: O Mapa da Mina - Wanda Machado
1992: Anos Rebeldes - Maria Lúcia
1991: O Dono do Mundo - Márcia
1989: Top Model - Duda (Maria Eduarda)
1988: Fera Radical - Cláudia
1987: O Outro - Glorinha da Abolição
1986: Anos Dourados - Lurdinha
1985: Ti Ti Ti - Valquíria
1984: Corpo a Corpo - Beatriz Fraga Dantas (Bia)
1983: Eu Prometo - Dóris Cantomaia

References

External links

1966 births
Living people
Actresses from Rio de Janeiro (city)
Brazilian people of Lebanese descent
Brazilian people of Luxembourgian descent
Brazilian people of Portuguese descent
Brazilian telenovela actresses
Brazilian film actresses
20th-century Brazilian actresses
21st-century Brazilian actresses